The third season of Canta Comigo was first released on Friday, April 23, 2021, on Netflix, premiering on RecordTV two days later, on Sunday, April 25, 2021, at  (BRT / AMT).

Rodrigo Faro, who had already hosted the first season of the teen series in 2020, replaced Gugu Liberato as the main series host.

On July 11, 2021, Camila and Pablo Braunna, known as Braunna Siblings, won the competition with 42.57% of the public vote over Angélica Sansone (35.26%) and André Luis (22.20%), thus becoming the first duo to win the show worldwide.

Heats
 Key
  – Artist advanced to the finals with an all-100 stand up
  – Artist advanced to the semifinals the highest score
  – Artist advanced to the sing-off in either 2nd or 3rd place
  – Artist score enough points to place in the Top 3 but was moved out and eliminated
  – Artist didn't score enough points to place in the Top 3 and was directly eliminated
  – Artist was eliminated but received the judges' save and advanced to the wildcard

Heat 1

Sing-off details

Heat 2

Sing-off details

Heat 3

Sing-off details

Heat 4

Sing-off details

Heat 5

Sing-off details

Heat 6

Sing-off details

Heat 7

Sing-off details

Heat 8

Sing-off details

Wildcard

Sing-off details

Semifinals
Prior to filming, Daniel Santos (Heat 5 winner) was disqualified from the competition after having tested positive for COVID-19.

Week 1

Sing-off details

Week 2

Sing-off details

Finals
Prior to filming, Dilma Oliveira (Heat 2 finalist) was disqualified from the competition after having tested positive for COVID-19.

 
 

Sing-off details

Elimination chart
Key

Ratings and reception

Brazilian ratings
All numbers are in points and provided by Kantar Ibope Media.

References

External links
 Canta Comigo 3 on R7.com

2021 Brazilian television seasons
All Together Now (franchise)